Hamadryades may refer to:
 Hamadryad, a type of tree nymph in Ancient Greek mythology
 Hamadryades, a synonym for Nicias, a genus of beetles